The Ambassadors Showband Derby is a marching band based in Derby, England

History
The band formed in September 1979 when the 11 founder members held a meeting at the house of Keith Holbrook in Briar Close, Borrowash. By the end of the meeting, the structure of the new organisation, as well as a constitution, had been agreed. Stuart Henson drew up the constitution, which had been agreed, and the Borrowash Band Fund was opened at the Midland Bank. The opening balance of £11 was the donation of £1 from each of the Founder Members. To these people we are eternally grateful.

At a committee meeting in January 1981, the name of the band was added to the constitution. The band may well have been called The Skyliners but after much debate the name, Ambassadors of Borrowash, was chosen.

The band joined the CBSL (Carnival Band Secretaries League) in the fall of 1981 and the performing members were equipped with uniforms.

The first public performance came on 10 July 1982 in a contest at Allestree where the band came third. Derby Regalia came first on this occasion. They continued to compete for the rest of the season as they gained confidence and experience.

Whilst entertaining the public at various fêtes, galas and shows, the band continued to improve in contests until on 25 June 1983 they achieved their first win in a competition. The contest at Duffield saw the Ambassadors secure first place with 77 out of 100 points beating the Rangers of Derby and the Derby Regalia who tied for second place with 76 points.

The band was invited to take part in the 2005 Birmingham Tattoo. Alongside bands such as the band of the Coldstream Guards and many others. This was be the biggest event that the band has ever taken part in.
w

Uniform
The uniform consists of a yellow shirt/blouse, red waistcoat, black trousers with red strips down the seams and yellow flashes at the bottom, the band also wear tri-corn hats.

Notable achievements
Duffield 25 June 1983 - First Contest attendance
Breaston 28 June 1986 - First Place
Ilkeston Sat 30 May 1987 - First Place
Long Eaton Sat 6 June 1987 - First Place
Ashbourne 11 July 1987 - First Place
Horsley Woodhouse Sat 18 July 1987 - First Place
Plessey (Beeston) 20 July 1987 - First Place
Chesterfield 1st Aug 1987 - First Place
Long Eaton Sunday 30 August 1987 - First Place
Ashbourne 9 July 1988 - First Place
Loscoe 10 July 1988 - First Place
Chesterfield 5th Aug 1988 - First Place
Alvaston - Wilmorton 18 June 1989  - First Place
Ashbourne 8 July 1989 - First Place
Loscoe 9 July 1989 - First Place
Kirk Hallam 6th Aug 1989 - First Place
Lowestoft Aug 12th 1989 - First Place
Wilmorton Sunday 17 June 1990 - First Place
Breaston June 23, 1990 - First Place
Granby Halls 29 September 1990 - First Place
Chaddesden 9 June 1991 - First Place
Ambergate (county show) 16 June 1991 - First Place
Breaston 22 June 1991 - First Place
Derby 13th Aug 1991 - First Place
Ashbourne 11 July 1992 - First Place
Derby 2 August 1992 - First Place
Lowestoft 8th Aug 1992 - First Place
Chaddesden 13 June 1993 - First Place
Heanor 26 June 1993 - First Place
Wilmorton 27 June 1993 - First Place
Bakewell 3 July 1993 - First Place
Ashbourne 10 July 1993 - First Place
Chaddesden 12 June 1994 - First Place
Chaddesden Sun 11 June 1995 - First Place
Breaston 24 June 1995 - First Place
Bakewell 1 July 1995 - First Place
Lowestoft 12 Aug 1995 - First Place
Derby 20th Aug 1995 - First Place
Breaston 22 June 1996 - First Place
Chapel-en-le-Frith 7 July 1996 - First Place
Horsley Woodhouse 20 July 1996 - First Place
Derby 4th Aug 1996 - First Place
Belper 17th Aug 1996 - First Place
Newton 2012 - First Place
Sutton-on-Sea 29 July 2012 - Best band on parade

References

External links
 

Music organisations based in the United Kingdom
British marching bands
College marching bands in the United Kingdom
Musical groups established in 1979